Tourism in Luxembourg is an important component of the national economy, representing about 8.3% of GDP in 2009 and employing some 25,000 people or 11.7% of the working population. Despite the 2008–2012 global recession, the Grand Duchy still welcomes over 900,000 visitors a year who spend an average of 2.5 nights in hotels, hostels or on camping sites. Business travel is flourishing representing 44% of overnight stays in the country and 60% in the capital, up 11% and 25% between 2009 and 2010. Published by the World Economic Forum in March 2011, the Travel and Tourism Competitiveness Report puts Luxembourg in 15th place worldwide, up from 23rd place in 2009.

Major destinations are historic Luxembourg City, the medieval castle of Vianden, Echternach with its abbey and the wine districts of the Moselle valley. The Mullerthal with its rocky cliffs in the east and the mountainous Oesling district in the Ardennes to the north are also favourites for outdoor enthusiasts.

Luxembourg has good road, rail and air connections with the rest of Europe, making it an increasingly popular destination for international meetings as well as for extended weekend stays. Over half the visitors to Luxembourg come from the Netherlands, Belgium and Germany with substantial numbers from France, the United Kingdom and the United States. Camping is popular in Luxembourg, particularly with the Dutch, who camp for much longer than other nationalities, especially in the Ardennes and the Mullerthal.

The Grand Duchy

A representative democracy and constitutional monarchy ruled by a Grand Duke, it is the world's only remaining Grand Duchy. The country has a highly developed economy, with the world's highest GDP per capita. Its strategic importance dates back to a Roman era fortress and Frankish count's castle site in the Early Middle Ages. The  City of Luxembourg, the capital and largest city, is the seat of several institutions and agencies of the European Union and an important financial centre.

Luxembourg culture is a mix of Romance Europe and Germanic Europe, borrowing customs from each of the distinct traditions. While Luxembourgers are fluent in all three of their official languages, German, French and Luxembourgish, most also have a good working knowledge of English.

Travel

Luxembourg's road network has been significantly modernised in recent years with motorways to Belgium, France and Germany. The advent of the high-speed TGV link to Paris has led to renovation of the city's railway station while the new passenger terminal at Luxembourg Airport handled over 1.6 million passengers in 2010, an increase of 5.1%.

There are frequent air connections with many European cities including Amsterdam, Berlin,  Copenhagen, Frankfurt, Geneva, London, Madrid, Paris and Rome. Paris can also be reached in just over two hours by rail and in about three and a half hours by road. Brussels is some two hours away by road, a little longer by rail.

Accommodation

In 2009, Luxembourg had 261 hotels, inns and hostels able to accommodate 14,709 guests. The central area including the City of Luxembourg had a capacity of 8,057 guests (55%) followed by the Ardennes region with a capacity of 2,757 (18%). The total number of nights spent in hotels, inns and hostels was 1,264,448, down 8% on 2007. The number of nights spent camping was 739,208, down 8.4%.

National celebrations

Luxembourg has a number of celebrations of its own, some of which date back centuries. Among the most popular are:

Buergbrennen: held on the Sunday after Shrove Tuesday, huge bonfires blaze throughout the country celebrating the end of winter.
Emaischen: held every Easter Monday in the village of Nospelt and in Luxembourg's Fish Market, the centrepiece of the pottery fair is the Péckvillchen, a bird-shaped earthenware whistle.
Octave: the main religious festival of the year, the octave is held in the second half of April for a period of two weeks when pilgrims come to the cathedral; a market on the Place Guillaume offers food, drink and religious artifacts.
Dancing procession of Echternach: held on Whit Tuesday in memory of St Willibrord, hundreds of people "spring" from left to right as they dance through the town, linked by white handkerchiefs.
National holiday: celebrated throughout the country on 23 June in honour of the grand duke, the festivities begin on the evening of the 22nd with a firework display in the centre of Luxembourg City.
Schueberfouer: the extensive fun fair with all the traditional rides goes up in Limpertsberg on the Glacis around 23 August and remains for about three weeks.
Wine festivals: usually held in October in the wine villages along the Moselle as a thanksgiving celebration for the grape harvest.
St Nicolas: Kleeschen, the patron saint of children, with his servant in black, arrives in every village accompanied by a brass band ready, in agreement with their parents, to distribute presents to the children.

Food and drink

Luxembourg cuisine combines the quality of French dishes with the quantity of German and Belgian servings. But there are also some national favourites such as Bouneschlupp, a soup with French beans, Judd mat Gaardebounen, neck of pork with broad beans, and Fritür, small fried fish from the Moselle. Dry white wines from the Moselle valley include Riesling, Pinot gris, Pinot blanc and Auxerrois and the less sophisticated Rivaner and Elbling. Also popular is Luxembourg's Crémant, a sparkling wine produced in accordance with the traditional method for French champagne.

Luxembourg City

The City of Luxembourg is not only a historic UNESCO site with its fortifications lining the steep valley but also an important European and financial centre with imposing modern buildings.

In September 2011, the Luxembourg City Tourist Office reported that after several years of decline, the city welcomed 403,085 tourists between January and August 2011, a 6.38 increase over 2010. The casemates were the most popular attraction with a total of 87,083 visitors, most of whom visited the Bock Casemates.

The old town

Within walking distance of each other, places of interest in the old town include the fortifications and the underground defences known as the casemates, the Grand Ducal Palace, the neogothic Cathedral of Notre Dame, Place Guillaume II with the City Hall, the Place d'Armes with its pavement restaurants and cafés, the Gëlle Fra or Golden Lady crowning the obelisk in memory of those who died for their country during the First World War and the nearby Adolphe Bridge towering over the valley.

There are also two particularly interesting museums in the old town. The Luxembourg City History Museum traces the history of the city from its foundations (in the lower floors) to the present (at the top) while the National Museum of History and Art showcases Celtic and Roman findings including the well-preserved Vichten Mosaic depicting the Roman muses.

The Grund

The valley itself, known as the Grund, also has points of interest such as the Neumünster Abbey and the Natural History Museum. Once a poor quarter of the city, it has become increasingly popular for its night life in the narrow medieval streets and for its gastronomic restaurants.

Kirchberg

The Kirchberg Plateau which covers the area between the city and the airport began to develop in the 1970s with office buildings for the European Institutions. Over the years, it has become the focus of Luxembourg's financial interests with an impressive array of banks and business centres. There have also been cultural developments such as the impressive Museum of Modern Art and the Philharmonie concert hall as well as sports and entertainment facilities.

Vianden

Located close to the German border in northeastern Luxembourg, Vianden is a small hilly town in a picturesque setting on the River Our. Visitors are attracted above all by the carefully restored medieval castle standing high above the river but also by the old-world atmosphere which pervades the town. 
 
Vianden Castle was built between the 11th and 14th centuries and became the seat of the counts of Vianden. It was further developed until the 18th century but with the departure of the Counts of Luxembourg to the Netherlands combined with the effects of fire and an earthquake, it slowly deteriorated. The final blow came in 1820 when William I of the Netherlands sold it to a local merchant who in turn sold off its contents and masonry piecemeal, reducing it to a ruin. Not until 1977, when Grand Duke Jean ceded the castle to the State, was it possible to undertake large-scale restoration work.

Vianden also has a chair lift up to a restaurant high above the castle, offering extensive views of the town and its mountainous surroundings. The Victor Hugo museum near the bridge over the River Our presents a number of the author's original letters and drawings in the house where he used to stay.

Echternach

With a population of some 4,000, Echternach near the German border is the oldest town in Luxembourg. It was founded in 698 by St. Willibrord, an English monk who was the abbot of the monastery until his death in 739. In his honour, for the past 500 years the dancing procession has taken place every Whit Tuesday, attracting pilgrims from near and far. The Romanesque basilica with symmetrical towers still houses his tomb in its crypt. The town of Echternach grew up around the abbey walls and was granted a city charter in 1236. The abbey was rebuilt in a handsome Baroque range in 1737. Echternach is also the site of a large Roman villa which was discovered in 1975 and is open to visitors.

The town, still surrounded by its medieval walls, hosts the International Music Festival in May and June each year. It is an ideal starting point for walks into the Mullertal or for cycle trips along the River Sure. Echternach also has an interesting Prehistory Museum.

The Moselle valley

Stretching  from Schengen in the south to Wasserbillig in the north, the rounded hills of the Moselle valley are lined by vineyards. The river passes a number of quaint little riverside towns and villages with narrow streets, wine cooperatives and annual wine festivals. From south to north, the river flows past Schengen, famous for the EU agreement facilitating cross-border travel, Remerschen, Schwebsange, Bech-Kleinmacher, Wellenstein and Remich which has been attracting wine-enthusiasts since Roman times and is still a busy venue for tourists with promenades, gardens, river excursions and wine cellars. After Stadtbredimus on the river front and Greiveldange up in the hills, the Moselle then passes the charming villages of Ehnen with its Wine Museum, Wormeldange, Ahn and Machtum where some of Luxembourg's finest restaurants are to be found. Then comes the small town of Grevenmacher before the Moselle meets the Sauer at the busy border town of Wasserbillig.

Other areas of interest

The Ardennes in the north of the country present excellent opportunities for ramblers and mountain bikers in an area of forested hills, rocky crags and green valleys. Additional attractions are the castles of Bourscheid, Brandenbourg, Clervaux, Esch-sur-Sûre, Vianden and Wiltz as well as the Lac de la Haute-Sûre which provides opportunities for swimming and water sports.

The Mullerthal, just north of Echternach, also offers interesting walking and cycling circuits through curious rock formations, often complete with caves. The motorist too can experience a surprising variety of countryside driving through the river valleys and up to the surprisingly flat plains above. Berdorf and Beaufort are popular tourist centres.

Mondorf-les-Bains in the south of the country not only has a range of modern spa and fitness facilities but is home to Luxembourg's only gambling facility, Casino 2000. Not far from Mondorf is one of the Luxembourg's most interesting Roman sites, Dalheim Ricciacum, with its old Roman theatre.

Attractions

The Bock casemates in Luxembourg City are open daily from 10 am to 5 pm from March to October. Now a UNESCO heritage site, these underground passages were part of Luxembourg's former defences.

The National Museum of Military History at Diekirch in the central part of Luxembourg provides insights into the Battle of the Bulge and related episodes of World War II. The museum is open every day from 10 am to 6 pm.

Les Thermes, an indoor/outdoor water park in Strassen just west of Luxembourg City, offers an olympic swimming pool, two pools for children, wave baths, slides and sauna.

From April to early October, the Parc Merveilleux near Bettembourg has a range of attractions for children including rides, mini zoo, and fairy tale presentations.

The historic steam Train 1900 operates between Petange and Fond-de-Gras in the south-east of Luxembourg on Sunday afternoons between May and September. From Fond-de-Gras, trips on the Minièresbunn narrow gauge railway are also possible.

The National Mining Museum in Rumelange, south-east Luxembourg, is open April to September from Thursday to Sunday, 2 pm to 6 pm. Lasting about an hour and a half, the visit includes a 20-minute trip on the old railway deep into the mine.

The Butterfly Garden in Grevenmacher is open every day from April to mid-October.

The Lankelz Railway in Esch-sur-Alzette, south-eastern Luxembourg, is a miniature railway on a scale of one third normal size. The railway operates on Sunday afternoons and public holidays from May to mid-October.

The Aquarium is located in Wasserbillig, a small town in the south west of Luxembourg. Open every day from Easter to the end of September, it is otherwise open every Friday, Saturday and Sunday. There are 15 tanks from 300 to 40,000 litres with fish from all five continents in their natural surroundings.

Arrivals by country
Total number of foreign tourists in Luxembourg in 2016 was 1,053,653. Most visitors arriving to Luxembourg and staying in accommodation in 2016 were from the following countries:

See also
List of castles in Luxembourg
List of museums in Luxembourg

External links

Luxembourg Tourist Office, London
Visit Luxembourg

References

 
Economy of Luxembourg
Luxembourg